Kwamie Lassiter (December 3, 1969 – January 6, 2019) was an American football safety. He was signed by the Arizona Cardinals as an undrafted free agent in 1995. He played college football at Kansas.

Early years
Born in Hampton, Virginia, Lassiter graduated from Menchville High School in Newport News, Virginia in 1989.

College career
Lassiter played his first two years of college football at Butler County Community College in 1989 and 1990 before transferring to the University of Kansas in 1991. He sat out the 1991 season, played at Kansas from 1992 to 1994, and graduated with a degree in communications. After Lassiter suffered a broken collarbone by the third game of the 1993 season, the NCAA granted Lassiter a sixth year of eligibility.

Professional career
Lassiter played for the Arizona Cardinals from 1995–2002, San Diego Chargers in 2003 and St. Louis Rams in 2004. He finished his career with 609 tackles (437 solo tackles), 25 interceptions, and four sacks.

In the Cardinals' final regular season game of the 1998 season, a 16-13 victory over the San Diego Chargers that clinched the Cardinals' first playoff berth in 15 years, Lassiter intercepted Chargers quarterback Craig Whelihan four times.

After the 2001 season, Lassiter was selected as an alternate for the 2002 Pro Bowl after reaching career highs with 112 tackles and 9 interceptions.

Lassiter spent the 2004 preseason with the Chargers and was cut. The St. Louis Rams signed Lassiter on September 21, 2004.

NFL statistics

Post-playing career
From 2006 to 2008, Lassiter was a pregame and postgame host for the Arizona Cardinals Radio Network.

From 2009 until his death, Lassiter hosted Kwamie Lassiter's Sports Talk on the VoiceAmerica Internet radio network.

From 2010 until his death, Lassiter was president of the NFL Alumni chapter in Arizona.

From 2009 to 2010, Lassiter was defensive backs coach at Mesa Community College. In 2012, Lassiter became defensive backs coach for the Las Vegas Locomotives of the UFL.

Personal life
Lassiter's son Kwamie Lassiter II plays for the Cincinnati Bengals.

Lassiter's daughter, Darian, is a professional dancer who was on the Phoenix Suns dance team as well as the Arizona Cardinals Cheerleaders. As of 2020, she is a member of the Dallas Cowboys Cheerleaders squad and appeared on season 15 of their reality television show Dallas Cowboys Cheerleaders: Making the Team.

Death
On January 6, 2019, Lassiter died aged 49 of a heart attack which he suffered while working out.

References

External links
Kwamie Lassiter biography from St. Louis Rams (archived from 2004)

1969 births
2019 deaths
American sports radio personalities
Arizona Cardinals players
American football safeties
Butler Grizzlies football players
Kansas Jayhawks football players
Place of death missing
Las Vegas Locomotives coaches
Sportspeople from Hampton, Virginia
Players of American football from Virginia
Sportspeople from Newport News, Virginia
St. Louis Rams players
San Diego Chargers players
Coaches of American football from Virginia
Mesa Thunderbirds football